Robert Blake Neller (born February 9, 1953) is a retired United States Marine Corps four-star general who served as the 37th Commandant of the Marine Corps. He assumed his assignment on September 24, 2015 and retired on July 11, 2019. He was succeeded by David H. Berger.

Early life
Neller was born in Camp Polk, Louisiana on February 9, 1953. A native of East Lansing, Michigan, he graduated from East Lansing High School in 1971. He enrolled in the University of Virginia and, at graduation, received his commission through Officer Candidates School via the Platoon Leaders Class program in May 1975.

Marine career
Neller's assignments in the operating forces include: Rifle and Weapons Platoon Commander and Company Commander with Company L, 3rd Battalion, 4th Marines, 3rd Marine Division; Commanding Officer, Company A, 1st Battalion, 1st Marines; Commanding Officer, 3rd Light Armored Infantry Battalion (LAI) and Commanding Officer, 6th Marine Regiment from 10 July 1998 to 6 July 2000. While with 3rd LAI he participated in Operation Restore Hope in Somalia. As the Commanding Officer, Marine Corps Security Force Company, Panama, he participated in Operations Just Cause and Promote Liberty. Additionally, he served as Executive Officer, 7th Marine Regiment, G-3, II Marine Expeditionary Force and G-3, 2nd Marine Division.

Other assignments include recruit series officer, aide-de-camp and as Director of Special Training Division MCRD San Diego, California. Neller served as Student Company Executive Officer and Tactics Instructor at The Basic School, Quantico, Virginia, and in Special Projects Directorate Headquarters Marine Corps. Additionally, he served as a Staff Officer in the Policy Division of the Supreme Headquarters Allied Powers Europe in Casteau, Belgium.

General officer assignments

As a general officer, Neller has served as the Assistant Division Commander of 2d Marine Division; the Director, Operations Division, Plans, Policies and Operations; as the Deputy Commanding General (Operations), 1st Marine Expeditionary Force (Forward) during Operation Iraqi Freedom from 2005 to 2007, and as the Assistant Division Commander for 1st Marine Division. Neller commanded 3rd Marine Division and served as President, Marine Corps University. From January 2011 to July 2012, he served as Director for Operations, J3, The Joint Staff, Washington, D.C.

Neller succeeded General Joseph Dunford as the 37th Commandant of the Marine Corps on September 24, 2015.

Education
Neller is a graduate of The Basic School, Armor Officer Advanced Course (now the Maneuver Captains Career Course), Marine Corps Command and Staff College, NATO Defense College, and the Armed Forces Staff College. He holds a Bachelor of Arts in History and Speech Communication from the University of Virginia and a Master of Arts in Human Resource Management from Pepperdine University. Neller is a member of Theta Chi fraternity.

After retirement 
On February 12, 2021, Secretary of Defense Lloyd Austin appointed Neller as one of four Departmental representatives to the Commission on the Naming of Items of the Department of Defense that Commemorate the Confederate States of America or Any Person Who Served Voluntarily with the Confederate States of America.

Awards and decorations

Notes

External links

 Biography at Marine Forces Europe and Africa website
  Biography at USMC website

1953 births
United States Marine Corps personnel of the Iraq War
Living people
People from East Lansing, Michigan
Recipients of the Defense Distinguished Service Medal
Recipients of the Navy Distinguished Service Medal
Recipients of the Legion of Merit
United States Marine Corps generals
United States Marine Corps Commandants
Grand Cordons of the Order of the Rising Sun